The Paint Lick Presbyterian Church is a historic church at KY 52 in Paint Lick, Kentucky. The Gothic Revival church was built in 1879 and added to the National Register of Historic Places in 1985.

It was deemed significant as "Garrard County's best example of a rural Italianate brick sanctuary as well as housing one of the area's oldest Presbyterian congregations" (founded in 1782).

References

Presbyterian churches in Kentucky
Churches on the National Register of Historic Places in Kentucky
Gothic Revival church buildings in Kentucky
Churches completed in 1879
19th-century Presbyterian church buildings in the United States
Churches in Garrard County, Kentucky
1879 establishments in Kentucky
National Register of Historic Places in Garrard County, Kentucky
Italianate architecture in Kentucky